Platynota capella is a species of moth of the family Tortricidae. It is found in Guatemala.

The wingspan is 21–24 mm. The forewings are greyish fawn, tinged with fawn brownish along the region of the fold, and suffused with dark brownish fuscous along the costa and upper edge of the cell. The hindwings are dark brownish grey.

References

Moths described in 1913
Platynota (moth)